Dongshan District is a district of the city of Hegang, Heilongjiang province, People's Republic of China.

Administrative divisions 
Dongshan District is divided into 5 subdistricts, 1 town and 2 townships. 
5 subdistricts
 Gongrencunban, Xinyiban, Sanjieban, Dongshanban, Hexingban
1 town
 Xinhua
2 townships
 Shuyuan, Dongfanghong

Notes and references 

Dongshan